Princess Uliana Olshanska (or ; d. 1448) was a noblewoman from the Olshanski (Halshanski, Alšėniškiai) family, the second wife of Vytautas, Grand Duke of Lithuania. They had no issue. Very little is known about Uliana's life. 

Her first husband was Ivan of Karachev. German chronicle of Johann von Posilge and Polish historian Jan Długosz asserted that Ivan was murdered so that widowed Uliana could marry Vytautas. Most likely she was an Eastern Orthodox who converted to Catholicism in order to marry Vytautas. 

After the death of his first wife Anna on 31 July 1418, Vytautas wished to marry Uliana, daughter of one of his closest allies Ivan Olshansky. However, Anna was sister of Agripina, who was wife of Ivan and mother of Uliana. That made Vytautas uncle-in-law of Uliana. Piotr Krakowczyk, Bishop of Vilnius, refused to perform the wedding ceremony due to this relationship and demanded they seek approval from the pope. Jan Kropidło, Bishop of Włocławek, performed the ceremony before Christmas 1418 and, eventually, Vytautas obtained a matrimonial dispensation from Pope Martin V.

It appears that the marriage was a loving one, but they had no children. Vytautas died in October 1430. Uliana died in 1448.

According to historian Ignas Jonynas Uliana's further life is unknown.

References

1448 deaths
Grand Duchesses of Lithuania
Uliana
Converts to Roman Catholicism from Eastern Orthodoxy
Former Lithuanian Orthodox Christians
Lithuanian Roman Catholics
Year of birth unknown